Godzilla is a series of children's novels about Godzilla, the Japanese movie monster, by Scott Ciencin.

The first novel, Godzilla, King of the Monsters,  shares the title of the  American version of the original film, but is not otherwise connected to it. The second, Godzilla Invades America, features Godzilla fighting a giant scorpion, Kamacuras, and Kumonga. The third book, Godzilla: Journey to Monster Island, features Rodan and Anguirus. The last book, Godzilla vs. the Space Monster, has a battle between Godzilla and King Ghidorah.

Series
Godzilla, King of the Monsters (1996)
Godzilla Invades America (1997)
Godzilla: Journey to Monster Island (1998)
Godzilla vs. the Space Monster (1998)

External links

Series of children's books
American children's novels
Godzilla (franchise)
Books based on films
Novels based on films